Nick Kahl may refer to:
 Nick Kahl (politician)
 Nick Kahl (baseball)